Lake Tacoma is the name given the freshwater lake in the basin of the Puyallup River and the Green River (Duwamish River) at the point in time that the Vashon Glacier had receded northward into Commencement Bay.  Prior to this, it was referred to as the Lake Puyallup. The bluff on which this city is built is used as the landmark where Lake Puyallup ceased and it became Lake Tacoma.

See also
Glacial Lake Russell

References

Skokomish
Skokomish
Pierce County, Washington
King County, Washington
Thurston County, Washington
Geography of Washington (state)
Tacoma